Mogoytuy (Mogoito) is an urban locality (an urban-type settlement) and the administrative center of Mogoytuysky District in Zabaykalsky Krai, Russia. Population:   .

Geography

It is located on river. Mogoytuy, 36 km to the north-east. from the village Aginskoye, 189 km (by rail) to the south-east. from Chita. There is a regional hospital and museum. There is a branch of the State Eastern Siberian Technological University of Ulan-Ude.

History
It was founded in 1907 with the arrival of a railroad station. Mogoytuy became the seat of the district in 1942. A power plant was commissioned in 1947. The settlement received town status in 1966.

Economy
There are 50 enterprises, organizations and institutions, including OAO  Mogoytuisk motor-repair plant, the tank farm, flour mill.

References

Urban-type settlements in Zabaykalsky Krai
1907 establishments in the Russian Empire